The following is a list of  Porsche vehicles, including past and present production models, as well as concept vehicles.

Current models

Model chronology
The following are models sorted by year of introduction. Street-legal racing models of the 1950s and 1960s are included.

1940s
 Porsche 356 (1948–1965)

1950s

 Porsche 550 (1953–1957)
 Porsche 718 (1957–1962)

1960s
 Porsche 904 (1963–1965)
 Porsche 911 (1963–present)
 Porsche 906 (1965–1966)
 Porsche 912 (1965–1969, 1976)
 Porsche 914 (1969–1976)

1970s
 Porsche 930 (1974–1989)
 Porsche 924 (1976–1988)
 Porsche 928 (1977–1995)

1980s
 Porsche 944 (1981–1991)
 Porsche 959 (1986–1988, 1992–1993)

1990s
 Porsche 968 (1992–1995)
 Porsche Boxster (1996–2004)

2000s
 Porsche Cayenne (2002–present)
 Porsche Carrera GT (2003–2007)
 Porsche Panamera (2009–present)

2010s
 Porsche 918 Spyder (2013–2015)
 Porsche Macan (2014–present)
 Porsche Cayman/Boxster 982 (2016-present)
 Porsche Taycan (2019–present)

Discontinued models

Concept models

Historical models

1898–1939

Racing models

Prototype Sports cars/Silhouettes

Formula single-seaters

Grand Touring

Rally

Tractors

 Porsche 110
 Porsche A 133
 Porsche AP Series (Allgaier AP) (AP16, AP17, AP22)
 Porsche Junior (4, 108, 109) (1952–1963)
 Porsche Master (408, 409, 418, 429)
 Porsche P 111
 Porsche P 122
 Porsche P 133
 Porsche P 144
 Porsche R22 (Allgaier R22) (1949–1952)
 Porsche Standard (208, 217, 218, 219, 238, AP, AP/S)
 Porsche Super (308, 309, 312, 318, 329, 339) (1956–1963)

See also

List of automobiles
List of Porsche engines
Porsche type numbers

References

 
Porsche